Gymnobela ioessa is a species of sea snail, a marine gastropod mollusk in the family Raphitomidae.

Etymology
The specific name is derived from ioessa, the feminine form of the Greek ioeis, meaning violet or dark brown, referring to the color of the shell.

Description
The anal sinus is broad and deep. General coloration is reddish-violet, with brown coloration inside the aperture. The radular teeth are long and thin with barbs at the ends, measuring about 170 micrometres long.

Distribution
G. ioessa is found in the Tanimbar Islands of Indonesia. and in the Arafura Sea, at depths between 836 m - 869 m.

References

External links
 MNHN, Paris: holotype

 

ioessa
Gastropods described in 1997